Raif Akbulut (born 1929) is a Turkish retired wrestler. He competed in the men's Greco-Roman lightweight at the 1952 Summer Olympics.

References

External links

1929 births
Possibly living people
Turkish male sport wrestlers
Olympic wrestlers of Turkey
Wrestlers at the 1952 Summer Olympics
Place of birth missing
20th-century Turkish people